Isthmohyla xanthosticta is a species of frogs in the family Hylidae. It is endemic to Costa Rica and only known from its type locality on the south slope of Volcan Barba in the Heredia Province. Common name south fork treefrog has been coined for it.

Description
The head is as wide as the body. The snout is moderately long and truncate. The tympanum is distinct but partly covered by the supra-tympanic fold. The forelimbs are moderately long and slender. The fingers bear large discs and are about one-fourth webbed. The hind limbs are moderately short and slender. The toes are about two-thirds webbed and bear discs that are slightly smaller than those on the fingers. The coloration is dorsally uniformly green, but the flanks and the thighs are brown with large yellow spots. There is a broad, bronze-tan canthal stripe. The throat and belly are pale yellow.

Habitat and conservation
The locality is within the Braulio Carrillo National Park. The habitat is pristine, and possible threats to this species could be chytridiomycosis, climate change, and airborne pollution.

References

Xanthosticta
Amphibians of Costa Rica
Endemic fauna of Costa Rica
Amphibians described in 1968
Taxa named by William Edward Duellman
Taxonomy articles created by Polbot